Rushville may refer to a place in the United States:

 Rushville, Illinois
 Rushville, Indiana
 Rushville, Iowa
 Rushville, Missouri
 Rushville, Nebraska
 Rushville, New York
 Rushville, Ohio